The following games were initially announced as Game Boy Advance titles, however were subsequently cancelled or postponed indefinitely by developers or publishers.

References

 
Game Boy Advance games
Game Boy Advance